The Dersios sinkhole (Greek: Σπηλαιοκαταβόθρα "Ο Δέρσιος" Spilaiokatavothra "O Dhersios") is a sinkhole in Arcadia, Greece.

It is about 45 minutes on unsurfaced road from the nearest town of Tyros in the Kynouria region of Arcadia. Since 2003, SELAS caving club in Greece has been exploring the cave, doubling the depth and more than tripling the length of the sinkhole. The new discoveries were made in 2003 by cave diving the first sump and emptying it by siphoning the water and in 2005 by emptying sumps in side passages of the sinkhole.

Landforms of Arcadia, Peloponnese
Caves of Greece
Wild caves
Sinkholes of Europe
Landforms of Greece
Landforms of Peloponnese (region)